Lapstone Oval is a sports precinct  in Lapstone, New South Wales. It supports sport all year round. The name Lapstone Oval covers all of the 3 different types of sporting facilities and not just the rugby field as is thought by some people, however the mightiest club in Subbies Rugby calls Lapstone Oval home. It is known to many opposition teams as the Graveyard; as many teams come to the foot of the mountains to be buried by the mighty Blue Men. Curator Matthew Lehn welcomes opposing teams with "welcome to the Graveyard"

Facilities 
There are a few features at Lapstone Oval.

 A rugby union field
 16 netball courts (10 are asphalt and the other 6 are grass)
 2 tennis courts which overlook the rugby field and half of the grass netball courts
 A small play area for younger children

During the winter months there is a canteen running at the bottom of the netball club-house and a BBQ on the grass next to it. A mobile coffee van turns up each week as well.

Home teams 
Several teams call the oval their home ground.

Netball 
Lapstone Oval is not a home ground to any of the netball teams in the Blue Mountains Netball Association (BMNA) as they all play there every week. 
The Blue Mountains Netball Representatives train at the oval.

Cricket 
Although some teams from Glenbrook-Blaxland Cricket Club (GBCC)  play some of their games at Lapstone the club doesn't have a single home ground. They also play in:

 Glenbrook
 Blaxland

Rugby Union 
The Blue Mountains Rugby Club (also known as Blueys or Blue Tongues) call the oval home. It is where they play their home games and they also have a club house at the ground.

Winter sport
In winter 2 sports are played at Lapstone Oval. They are:

 Rugby Union
 Netball

Summer sport
During the summer an artificial cricket pitch is placed into the centre of the rugby field. In the past few summers the rugby goal posts have been taken out.

References 

Sports venues in New South Wales